This is the Jake Gosling discography, giving an overview of the albums, EPs and singles that Gosling produced.

Studio albums
 Anthems For Doomed Youth - The Libertines
 x - Ed Sheeran
 Midnight Memories - One Direction
 Head or Heart - Christina Perri
 Peroxide - Nina Nesbitt
 All We Are - ORB
 Take Me Home - One Direction
 Fire Within - Birdy
 Up All Night - One Direction
 Fall to Grace - Paloma Faith
 This Life - The Original Rudeboys
 + - Ed Sheeran
 See Clear Now - Wiley
 Illuminate - Shawn Mendes
 Now - Shania Twain
 Dancing Shadows - Mario

Extended plays
 Loose Change - Ed Sheeran
 Songs I Wrote with Amy - Ed Sheeran
 Live at the Bedford - Ed Sheeran
 No. 5 Collaborations Project - Ed Sheeran
 The Slumdon Bridge- Ed Sheeran (with Yelawolf)
 Apple Tree EP - Nina Nesbitt

Singles produced
Mercy - Shawn Mendes
Smile - Gorgon City Feat Elderbrook
Little Things - One Direction
Thinking Out Loud - Ed Sheeran 
The A Team - Ed Sheeran
Lego House - Ed Sheeran
Give Me Love - Ed Sheeran
You Need Me, I Don't Need You - Ed Sheeran
Drunk - Ed Sheeran
Small Bump - Ed Sheeran
Picking Up The Pieces - Paloma Faith
Just Be - Paloma Faith
Black and Blue - Paloma Faith
30 Minute Love Affair - Paloma Faith
Tattoo - Hilary Duff
The Apple Tree - Nina Nesbitt
Boy - Nina Nesbitt
Stay Out - Nina Nesbitt
Way In The World - Nina Nesbitt
Summertime - Wiley
Cash In My Pocket - Wiley
See Clear Now - Wiley
Long May They Roll - James Jay Picton
The Message - Nate James
Dirty Rider - Mikill Pane
Chairman Of The Bored - Mikill Pane 
Summer In The City - Mikill Pane 
Play It Loud - Giggs
Old School Love - Lupe Ft Ed Sheeran 
Fire - Jeluzz ft Jake Gosling
Its My Time - Scorcher

Songwriting credits
Smile - Gorgon City Feat Elderbrook
Drunk - Ed Sheeran
Give Me Love - Ed Sheeran
Lego House - Ed Sheeran
The City - Ed Sheeran
The Parting Glass - Ed Sheeran
U.N.I - Ed Sheeran
Wake Me Up - Ed Sheeran
Autumn Leaves - Ed Sheeran
Lately - Ed Sheeran
You - Ed Sheeran
Family - Ed Sheeran
Radio - Ed Sheeran
Drown Me Out - Ed Sheeran
Nightmares - Ed Sheeran
Goodbye To You - Ed Sheeran
Summertime - Wiley
See Clear Now - Wiley
I Need To Be - Wiley
5am - Wiley
Turn It Up - Wiley
Can't Stop Thinking - Wiley
No Interest - Nina Nesbitt
Way In The World - Nina Nesbitt
Align - Nina Nesbitt
18 Candles - Nina Nesbitt
Tough Luck - Nina Nesbitt
The Apple Tree - Nina Nesbitt
Some You Win - Nina Nesbitt
Unhappy Ending - Jenna Andrews
Tattoo - Hilary Duff
Dirty Rider - Mikill Pane
The Craig Bang - Mikill Pane
Chairman of Bored - Mikill Pane
Summer in the City - Mikill Pane
Straight to the Bottom - Mikill Pane
Play It Loud - Giggs ft. Ed Sheeran
Blank Page -Jezzabell Doran 
Home - Birdy
Planes Fly - Angle Haze
What If - The ORB
Never Alone - ORB
Can't Let Go - ORB
Travelling Man - ORB
Blue Eyes - ORB
Written Songs - ORB
Holiday - KSI

References

Production discographies